Dibromofluoromethane is a mixed halomethane. It is soluble in alcohol, acetone, benzene and chloroform.

Applications
It can be used to prepare bromofluoromethane by reductive debromination with organotin hydride as tributyltin hydride.

Regulations
Its ozone depletion potential (ODP) is 1.0 and it is included in list of Class I Ozone-Depleting Substances.

References

Halomethanes
Ozone depletion
Organobromides
Organofluorides